Only a few dozen cardinals of the Roman Catholic Church have been excommunicated by the Catholic Church. A cardinal is a Roman Catholic priest, deacon, or bishop entitled to vote in a papal election.  They are collectively known as the College of Cardinals.

Excommunication—literally, the denial of communion—usually means that a person is barred from participating in the Sacraments or holding ecclesiastical office. Ne Romani (1311), promulgated by Pope Clement V during the Council of Vienne, extended suffrage in papal election to excommunicated cardinals in an attempt to limit schisms.

This list includes only cardinals who have been explicitly excommunicated by a pope or ecumenical council, rather than those who (depending on one's interpretation) may have been excommunicated latae sententiae. For example, several precepts of papal election law prescribed automatic excommunication, such as Licet de vitanda of the Lateran Council which prohibited election by one-third, and Pope Pius X's Commissum Nobis, which made the exercise of the jus exclusivae by any cardinal punishable by excommunication. It also does not include excommunicated quasi-cardinals (cardinals elevated by antipopes) or clerics excommunicated before receiving the red hat.

Many excommunicated cardinals reconciled (most often with the successor of their excommunicator) and had their offices restored. Some would later be elected pope; for example, Formosus and Sergius III.

9th century

11th century

12th century

13th century

15th century

16th century

18th century

See also
List of people excommunicated by the Roman Catholic Church

References 

 
Excommunicated